Federal Medical Centre, Owerri is a public health care centre located in Owerri city in Imo State, southeastern Nigeria.

History 
In 1903, Federal Medical Centre, Owerri was founded as a colonial dispensary. It was promoted to a District Hospital, then a General Hospital, before finally becoming a federal medical centre in 1995.

It is a 700-bed capacity hospital.

References 

Hospitals in Nigeria
Hospitals established in 1903